Dagoberto Gilb (born 1950 in Los Angeles), is an American writer who writes extensively about the American Southwest.

He attended the University of California, Santa Barbara, where he earned both bachelor's and master's degrees. Gilb embarked on a career in construction, became a journeyman carpenter, and joined the United Brotherhood of Carpenters and Joiners in Los Angeles.

Background
Gilb was born to a mother from Mexico who came across the border illegally, while his father was born in Kentucky. Gilb's parents were raised in Los Angeles from a young age—his mother in downtown L.A., his father in Boyle Heights. Both spoke Spanish. The two divorced when he was very young, and he was raised by his mother. His father worked for 49 years in an industrial laundry, where he became the floor supervisor. His mother was a model in her early years, then became a dental assistant, until she remarried two more times.

Gilb began working at thirteen as a sheet shaker, then found jobs as a janitor and a factory shipping clerk. After high school, he went to several community colleges, working full-time as a paper cutter and as a stockboy in a major department store. He finally transferred to the University of California, Santa Barbara. He graduated in 1974 with a double major in Philosophy and Religious Studies, remaining there until he also received M.A. in Religious Studies in 1976.

From 1976-79 Gilb worked in many areas of the construction trades to make his living, as a laborer, stonemason, and carpenter. A new father, by 1979 he had joined the United Brotherhood of Carpenters and Joiners of America, and he worked as a journeyman until 1992. Though he did all facets of carpentry work, his main employment was as class-A high-rise.

Writing career
In 1977 while completing a never-published novel, Gilb was working on a three-story addition to the museum at the University of Texas at El Paso when he learned of the writer Raymond Carver, who was teaching across the campus street and was only at the beginning of his national acclaim.  Because of Carver's prominence, Gilb turned to short stories, and he began publishing in 1982.  The first bound work of his own was a chapbook-sized collection, Winners on the Pass Line (1985), also the first by El Paso's Cinco Puntos Press.  His first full book of stories (35 had been published in magazines by then) was The Magic of Blood (1993), with the University of New Mexico Press. The stories are populated by working men, Mexican American, who live in the Southwest.  It won the 1994 PEN/Hemingway Foundation Award, the Jesse Jones Texas Institute of Letters Award, and was a PEN Faulkner finalist.

More books followed, all published in New York by Grove Press:  a novel, The Last Known Residence of Mickey Acuña (1994), about a drifter living at a financial border as a resident of a YMCA on the El Paso border; a collection of short fiction, Woodcuts of Women (2001), stories of men obsessed with women; a collection of nonfiction essays, Gritos (2003), a finalist for the National Book Critics' Circle Award, collecting Gilb's nonfiction essays as a construction worker, a writer, a teacher, and a parent; an anthology, Hecho en Tejas (2006), winner of the PEN Southwest Book Award, now the canonical work of record for Mexican American literature in Texas; and the novel The Flowers (2008), an urban survival tale of a Chicano becoming a man in a city on the verge of a white-and-black race riot. Before the End, After the Beginning (2011) is his latest collection of short fiction. As an after effect of a stroke Gilb suffered in 2009, the book is a meditation on the transitory, on impermanence, on  "unseen" people, themes and characters Gilb has always dwelled on, now heightened.

In Gritos, the collection of mostly autobiographical essays, Gilb locates his work in American letters, and by doing so, claims space for Chicanos in American life and culture. Gilb labels his narrative approach “first-person stupid,” but critics praise its candor, depth, and clarity (despite or maybe because of the author's rejection of heavy-handed commentary).  The essays are parable-like: “fool stories” that express learned wisdom.

Gilb has also worked on a few movies and documentaries and spent several years writing commentaries which aired on the NPR show Fresh Air.  In 1997, he accepted a job teaching in the MFA program at Southwest Texas State University, now Texas State University.  In September 2009, Gilb joined the faculty of the University of Houston–Victoria as a Writer-in-Residence and Executive Director of Centro Victoria:  Center for Mexican American Literature and Culture.

Awards
James D. Phelan Award, San Francisco Foundation, 1984
Dobie-Paisano Fellowship, Texas Institute of Letters, 1987
National Endowment for the Arts Fellowship, 1992
Whiting Award, 1993
PEN/Hemingway Award, 1994
PEN Faulkner Award, finalist, 1994
El Paso Writers' Hall of Fame, 1995
Guggenheim Foundation Fellowship, 1995
National Book Critics Circle Award, finalist, 2003
Texas Book Festival Bookend Award, 2007
PEN Southwest Book Award, 2008

Books
Winners on the Pass Line and Other Stories, 1985
The Magic of Blood, 1993
The Last Known Residence of Mickey Acuña, 1994
Woodcuts of Women, 2001
Gritos, 2003
Hecho en Tejas:  An Anthology of Texas Mexican Literature, 2006
The Flowers, 2008
Before the End, After the Beginning, 2011

Selected works
"Down in the West Texas Town", Puerto del Sol, Spring 1982
"Where the Sun Don't Shine",  The Threepenny Review, Fall 1983
"Look on the Bright Side",  The Pushcart Prize XVII:  Best of the Small Presses, 1992
"Poverty Is Always Starting Over", Fresh Air, July 26, 1994
"Northeast Direct", The Threepenny Review, Fall 1996; The Best American Essays, 1999
"María de Covina", The New Yorker, September 29, 1997
"Victoria",  The Best American Essays, 1999
"I Knew She Was Beautiful", The New Yorker, March 13, 2000
"Work Is Good" Carpenter, September/October 2000
"Romero's Shirt",  Still Wild, 2000
"Pride",  The Texas Observer, May 24, 2001
"Blue Eyes, Brown Eyes",  Harper's Magazine, June 2001
"Documenting the Undocumented", The Los Angeles Times, July 5, 2001
"About Tere Who Was in Palomas",  Pushcart Prize Stories XXVI:  Best of the Small Presses, 2001 
"Sentimental for Steinbeck", The New York Times, March 18, 2002
"Spanish Guy",  The New Yorker, April 22 & 29, 2002
"You Know Him by His Labors", The Los Angeles Times, January 14, 2004
"Me Macho, You Jane", The Barcelona Review, September–October 2004
"Willows Village",  Harper's Magazine, September 2008
"please, thank you", Harper's Magazine, June 2010
"Uncle Rock", The PEN/O'Henry Prize Stories, 2012

References

Sources
"Dagoberto Gilb." Writers Directory, 24th ed. St. James Press, 2008.
"Dagoberto Gilb." Grove Press

External links

 Interview with Gilb on Words on a Wire
Profile at The Whiting Foundation

University of Houston–Victoria faculty
University of California, Santa Barbara alumni
American writers of Mexican descent
Living people
Hispanic and Latino American short story writers
Hispanic and Latino American novelists
1950 births
Hemingway Foundation/PEN Award winners
American male novelists
American male short story writers
American short story writers
PEN/Faulkner Award for Fiction winners
Novelists from Texas